A tenor is a type of classical male singing voice whose vocal range lies between the countertenor and baritone voice types. It is the highest male chest voice type. The tenor's vocal range extends up to C5. The low extreme for tenors is widely defined to be B2, though some roles include an A2 (two As below middle C). At the highest extreme, some tenors can sing up to the second F above middle C (F5).

History 

The name "tenor" derives from the Latin word tenere, which means "to hold". As Fallows, Jander, Forbes, Steane, Harris and Waldman note in the "Tenor" article at Grove Music Online:

In polyphony between about 1250 and 1500, the [tenor was the] structurally fundamental (or 'holding') voice, vocal or instrumental; by the 15th century it came to signify the male voice that sang such parts.

All other voices were normally calculated in relation to the tenor, which often proceeded in longer note values and carried a borrowed Cantus firmus melody. Until the late 16th-century introduction of the contratenor singers, the tenor was usually the highest voice, assuming the role of providing a foundation. It was also in the 18th century that "tenor" came to signify the male voice that sang such parts. Thus, for earlier repertoire, a line marked 'tenor' indicated the part's role, and not the required voice type; indeed, even as late as the eighteenth century, partbooks labelled 'tenor' might contain parts for a range of voice types.

Vocal range 

The vocal range of the tenor is one of the highest of the male voice types. Within opera, the lowest note in the standard tenor repertoire is widely defined to be B2. However, the role of Rodrigo di Dhu (written for Andrea Nozzari) in Rossini's rarely performed La donna del lago is defined as a tenor but requires an A2. Within more frequently performed repertoire, Mime and Herod both call for an A2. A few tenor roles in the standard repertoire call for a "tenor C" (C5, one octave above middle C). Some, if not all, of the few top Cs in the standard operatic repertoire are either optional—such as in "Che gelida manina" in Puccini's La bohème—or interpolated (added) by tradition, such as in "Di quella pira" from Verdi's Il trovatore); however, the highest demanded note in the standard tenor operatic repertoire is D5, found in "Mes amis, écoutez l'histoire" from Adolphe Adam's Le postillon de Lonjumeau and "" from Fromental Halévy's La Juive). In the leggero repertoire, the highest note is F5 (Arturo in "Credeasi, misera" from Bellini's I puritani), therefore, very few tenors have this role in their repertoire without transposition (given the raising of concert pitch since its composition), or resorting to falsetto.

In choral music 

In SATB four-part mixed chorus, the tenor is the second lowest vocal range, above the bass and below the alto and soprano. Men's chorus usually denotes an ensemble of TTBB in which the first tenor is the highest voice. Whilst certain choral music does require the first tenors to ascend the full tenor range, the majority of choral music places the tenors in the range from approximately B2 up to A4. The requirements of the tenor voice in choral music are also tied to the style of music most often performed by a given choir. Orchestral choruses typically call for tenors with fully resonant voices, but chamber or a cappella choral music (choral music sung with no instrumental accompaniment) can rely on baritones singing in falsetto.

Even so, one nearly ubiquitous facet of choral singing is the shortage of tenor voices. Most men 18 and older tend to have baritone chest voices, and because of this, many men in choirs tend to prefer singing in the bass section (though true basses are even rarer than tenors). Many baritones sing tenor even if they are not able to cover the full range in only their chest voice, and sometimes contraltos sing the tenor part. In men's choruses that consist of four male vocal parts (TTBB; tenor 1, tenor 2, bass 1, bass 2), tenors will often sing both in chest voice and falsetto, extending the vocal range of the choir.

Subtypes and roles in opera 
Within the tenor voice type category are seven generally recognized subcategories: leggero tenor, lyric tenor, spinto tenor, dramatic tenor, heldentenor, Mozart tenor, and tenor buffo or spieltenor. There is considerable overlap between the various categories of role and of voice-type; some tenor singers have begun with lyric voices but have transformed with time into spinto or even dramatic tenors.

Leggero 
Also known as the tenore di grazia, the leggero tenor is essentially the male equivalent of a lyric coloratura. This voice is light, agile, and capable of executing difficult passages of fioritura. The typical leggero tenor possesses a range spanning from approximately C3 to E5, with a few being able to sing up to F5 or higher in full voice. In some cases, the chest register of the leggero tenor may extend below C3. Voices of this type are utilized frequently in the operas of Rossini, Donizetti, Bellini and in music dating from the Baroque period.

Leggero tenor roles in operas:

Lyric 
The lyric tenor is a warm graceful voice with a bright, full timbre that is strong but not heavy and can be heard over an orchestra. Lyric tenors have a range from approximately the C one octave below middle C (C3) to the D one octave above middle C (D5). Similarly, their lower range may extend a few notes below the C3. There are many vocal shades to the lyric tenor group, repertoire should be selected according to the weight, colors, and abilities of the voice.

Gilbert Duprez (1806–1896) was a historically significant lyric tenor. He was the first tenor to sing on stage the operatic high C from the chest (ut de poitrine) as opposed to using falsettone. He is also known for originating the role of Edgardo in Lucia di Lammermoor.

Lyric tenor roles in operas:

Spinto 
The spinto tenor has the brightness and height of a lyric tenor, but with a heavier vocal weight enabling the voice to be "pushed" to dramatic climaxes with less strain than the lighter-voice counterparts. Spinto tenors have a darker timbre than a lyric tenor, without having a vocal color as dark as many (not all) dramatic tenors. The difference is often the depth and metal in the voice where some lyric tenors age or push their way into singing as a Spinto giving them a lighter tone and a  tends to be either a young heldentenor or true lyric spinto. Spinto tenors have a range from approximately the C one octave below middle C (C3) to the C one octave above middle C (C5).

Spinto tenor roles in operas:

Dramatic 
Also "tenore robusto", the dramatic tenor has an emotive, ringing and very powerful, clarion, heroic tenor sound. The dramatic tenor's approximate range is from the B one octave below middle C (B2) to the B one octave above middle C (B4) with some able to sing up to the C one octave above middle C (C5). Many successful dramatic tenors though have historically avoided the coveted high C in performance. Their lower range tends to extend into the baritone tessitura or, a few notes below the C3, even down to A♭2. Some dramatic tenors have a rich and dark tonal colour to their voice (such as the mature Enrico Caruso) while others (like Francesco Tamagno) possess a bright, steely timbre.

Dramatic tenor roles in operas:

Heldentenor 

The heldentenor (English: heroic tenor) has a rich, dark, powerful and dramatic voice. As its name implies, the heldentenor vocal Fach features in the German romantic operatic repertoire. The heldentenor is the German equivalent of the tenore drammatico, however with a more baritonal quality: the typical Wagnerian protagonist. The keystone of the heldentenor's repertoire is arguably Wagner's Siegfried, an extremely demanding role requiring a wide vocal range and great power, plus tremendous stamina and acting ability. Often the heldentenor is a baritone who has transitioned to this Fach or tenors who have been misidentified as baritones. Therefore, the heldentenor voice might or might not have facility up to high B or C. The repertoire, however, rarely calls for such high notes.

Heldentenor roles in operas:

Mozart 
A Mozart tenor is yet another distinct tenor type. In Mozart singing, the most important element is the instrumental approach of the vocal sound which implies: flawless and slender emission of sound, perfect intonation, legato, diction and phrasing, capability to cope with the dynamic requirements of the score, beauty of timbre, secure line of singing through perfect support and absolute breath control, musical intelligence, body discipline, elegance, nobility, agility and, most importantly, ability for dramatic expressiveness within the narrow borders imposed by the strict Mozartian style.

The German Mozart tenor tradition goes back to the end of the 1920s, when Mozart tenors started making use of Caruso's technique (a tenor who rarely sang Mozart) to achieve and improve the required dynamics and dramatic expressiveness.

Mozart tenor roles in operas:

Tenor buffo or spieltenor 
A Tenor buffo or spieltenor is a tenor with good acting ability, and the ability to create distinct voices for his characters. This voice specializes in smaller comic roles. The range of the tenor buffo is from the C one octave below middle C (C3) to the C one octave above middle C (C5). The tessitura of these parts ranges from lower than other tenor roles to very high and broad. These parts are often played by younger tenors who have not yet reached their full vocal potential or older tenors who are beyond their prime singing years. Only rarely will a singer specialize in these roles for an entire career. In French opéra comique, supporting roles requiring a thin voice but good acting are sometimes described as 'trial', after the singer Antoine Trial (1737–1795), examples being in the operas of Ravel and in The Tales of Hoffmann.

Tenor buffo or spieltenor roles in operas:

Gilbert and Sullivan and operetta 
All of Gilbert and Sullivan's Savoy operas have at least one lead lyric tenor character. Notable operetta roles are:

 Candide, Candide (Bernstein)
 Alfred, Die Fledermaus (Johann Strauss II)
 Eisenstein, Die Fledermaus (Johann Strauss II)
 Camille, Count de Rosillon, The Merry Widow (Lehár)
 Prince Karl, The Student Prince (Romberg)
 Captain Dick, Naughty Marietta (Herbert)
 Frederic, "The Pirates of Penzance" (Gilbert and Sullivan)

Other uses 
There are four parts in barbershop harmony: bass, baritone, lead, and tenor (lowest to highest), with "tenor" referring to the highest part. The tenor generally sings in falsetto voice, corresponding roughly to the countertenor in classical music, and harmonizes above the lead, who sings the melody. The barbershop tenor range is Middle C to A one octave above Middle C, though it is written an octave lower. The "lead" in barbershop music is equivalent to the normal tenor range.

In bluegrass music, the melody line is called the lead. Tenor is sung an interval of a third above the lead. Baritone is the fifth of the scale that has the lead as a tonic, and may be sung below the lead, or even above the lead (and the tenor), in which case it is called "high baritone".

See also

 Category of tenors
 Fach system for voice classification
 List of tenors in non-classical music
 Voice classification in non-classical music

References

External links 
 
 

 
Choral music
Musical terminology
Opera terminology
Pitch (music)
Voice types